This is a list of former high schools in Louisiana.

Former Louisiana high schools

A
Abramson Science and Technology Charter School, New Orleans
Alcee Fortier High School, New Orleans
Alfred Lawless High School, New Orleans
Algiers Technology Academy, New Orleans
Archbishop Blenk High School, Gretna
Ashland High School, Ashland

B
Batchelor High School, Batchelor
Bernice High School, Bernice
Bethel Christian School, Jennings
Bishop McManus Academy, New Orleans
Boothville-Venice High School, Boothville
Buras High School, Buras

C
Cenla Christian Academy, Alexandria
Chaneyville High School, Chaneyville
Chataignier High School, Chataignier
Christian Life Academy, Baton Rouge
Clarks High School, Clarks
Clifton L. Ganus High School, New Orleans
Clinton High School (Louisiana), Clinton
Columbia High School (Columbia) , Columbia
Cor Jesu High School, New Orleans
Cotton Valley High School, Cotton Valley
Cottonport High School, Cottonport
Crescent Leadership Academy, New Orleans

D
Desire Street Academy, New Orleans
Dubach High School, Dubach

E
Epps High School, Epps

F
Fair Park High School, Shreveport
Farmerville High School, Farmerville
Fellowship School, rural Claiborne Parish
Fellowship School, Lillie
Forest Hill High School, Forest Hill
Francis T. Nicholls High School, New Orleans

G
G.W. Carver High School, Hahnville
G.W. Carver High School, Kinder
Gonzales High School, Gonzales
Grand Cane High School, Grand Cane
Grambling High School, Grambling
Greater Gentilly High School, New Orleans
Greensburg High School, Greensburg

H
Holy Name High School, New Orleans

I
Immaculata High School, Marrero
Innis High School, Innis

J
Jackson High School (Louisiana), Jackson
J.M. Davidson High School, St. Joseph
John McDonogh High School, New Orleans
Jonesboro High School, Jonesboro
Joseph S. Clark Preparatory High School, New Orleans

K
Katie B. Thomas High School, Elton
Kelly School, Kelly
Kennedy High School, Gonzales
Kenner High School, Kenner
Kent Hadley High School, Raceland
KIPP Booker T. Washington High School, New Orleans
KIPP Renaissance High School, New Orleans
Kisatchie High School, Kisatchie

L
La Harpe Street Academy, New Orleans
Lake Area New Tech Early College High School, New Orleans
Lake Charles High School, Lake Charles
Lake Charles-Boston High School, Lake Charles
Lake Providence High School, Lake Providence
Landry Memorial High School, Lake Charles
Lanes Chapel High School, Downsville
Lanier High School, Shreveport
Larose High School, Larose
Larose-Cut Off High School, Larose
Lawtell High School, Lawtell 
L.B. Landry High School, New Orleans
L. E. Rabouin Career Magnet School, New Orleans
L. E. Rabouin Memorial Trades School, New Orleans
L. E. Rabouin Vocational High School, New Orleans
Lecompte High School, Lecompte
Leonville High School, Leonville
Lillie High School, Lillie
Lincoln High School, Marrero
Lincoln High School, Ruston
Lincoln-Morrow High School, Morrow
Lincoln Road High School, Alexandria
Linear High School, Shreveport
Linville High School, Linville
Lisbon High School, Lisbon
Little Flower High School, Monroe
Lockport High School, Lockport
Lowery High School, Donaldsonville
Lucy School, near Edgard
Lutherville School, Mansura
Lynn Oaks School, Braithwaite
Lyon High School, Covington

M
Magnolia High School, Vacherie
Mamou-Rosenwald High School, Mamou
Mansfield Academy, Donaldsonville
Mansfield Baptist Academy, Mansfield
Mansura High School, Mansura
Marion High School, Marion
Marion High School, Lake Charles
Marion Abramson High School, New Orleans
Marrero High School, Marrero
Marthaville High School, Marthaville
Martin High School, Sicily Island
Martin Behrman High School, New Orleans
Mary Bethune High School, Welsh
Mary M. Bethune High School, Norco
Mary M. Bethune High School, Shreveport 
Mary Graham High School, Colfax
Maurice High School, Maurice
Mayfield High School, Homer
McDonogh 35 Senior High School
McKowen High School, Jackson
Meaux High School, Meaux
Melville High School, Melville
Menard Central High School, Alexandria
Metairie High School, Metairie
Mid-City Baptist High School, New Orleans
Miller-McCoy Academy, New Orleans
Mineral Springs High School, rural Lincoln Parish
Mineral Springs High School, rural Ouachita Parish
Minden Academy, Minden
Mission School, Napoleonville
Monroe High School, Monroe
Monroe Christian School, Monroe
Mooringsport High School, Mooringsport
Morehouse High School, Bastrop
Moreauville High School, Moreauville
Morgan City Academy, Morgan City
Morganza High School, Morganza
Morrow High School, Morrow
Mossville High School, Mossville
Mount Carmel Catholic School, New Iberia
Mount Carmel Catholic School, Opelousas
Mount Mariah High School, Chatham
Mount Olive High School, Blanchard
Mount Pisgah High School, rural Claiborne Parish
Mount Pleasant High School, Forbing
Myles High School, Sterlington

N
Napoleonville High School, Napoleonville
Natchez High School, near Cloutierville
Natchitoches Academy, Natchitoches
Natchitoches High School, Natchitoches
New Hope Christian Academy, Kinder
New Orleans Academy, New Orleans
New Roads High School, New Roads
Newellton High School, Newellton
Noble High School, Noble
North Eunice High School, Eunice
North Iberville High School, Rosedale

O
Oak Hill High School, Shreveport
Oak Grove High School, Oak Grove (Sabine Parish)
Oak Ridge High School, Oak Ridge
Ogden High School, Liddieville
Oil City High School, Oil City
Olla High School, Olla
O.P. Walker High School, New Orleans
Opelousas Academy, Opelousas
Our Lady of Fatima Catholic School, Lafayette
O.W. Dillon High School, Kentwood

P
P. L. Dunbar High School, Simmesport
P. L. Dunbar High School, Washington
Palestine School, Gibsland
Park Avenue High School, Franklin
Paul Breaux High School, Lafayette
Pecan Island High School, Pecan Island
Pelican All Saints High School, Pelican
Perrin High School, Ponchatoula
Phyllis Wheatley High School, Melville
Pierre Capdau Early College High School, New Orleans
Pineview High School, Covington
Pineview High School, Lisbon
Pine Crest High School, Winnfield
Pine Flats High School, Many
Pine Grove High School, Pine Grove
Pine Valley High School, Vivian
Pioneer School, Pioneer
Plain Dealing Academy, Plain Dealing
Plaisance High School, Plaisance
Pointe Coupee Central High School, Morganza
Poland High School, Poland
Pollock High School, Pollock
Port Sulphur High School, Port Sulphur
Poydras High School, Poydras
Prairieville High School, Duplessis
Pride High School, Pride
Princeton High School, Shreveport
Promised Land Academy, Braithwaite
Prytania Private School, New Orleans

R
Raceland High School, Raceland
Ragley High School, Ragley
Rayville-Rosenwald High School, Rayville
Redeemer High School, New Orleans
Redeemer-Seton High School, New Orleans
Redemptorist High School, Baton Rouge
Redemptorist Boys and Girls High School, New Orleans
Redmon Spikes High School, Elm Grove
Reidheimer-Creston High School, Natchitoches
Reserve High School, Reserve
Reserve Christian School, Reserve
Rhymes-Rosenwald High School, Rayville
Richardson High School, Monroe
Ridgedale Academy, West Monroe
Robeline School, Robeline
Robert E. Lee High School, Baton Rouge; see Lee Magnet High School.
Roberts Academy, Cheneyville
Rochelle School, Rochelle
Rodessa School, Rodessa
Rosedale High School, Rosedale
Rosenwald High School, New Roads
Rosenwald High School, Rosenwald
Rosenwald-Covington High School, Covington
Rosenwald-Logansport High School, Logansport
Ross High School, Minden
Rougon High School, Rougon
Rueben McCall High School, Tallulah
Runnels High School, Baton Rouge
Ruston Academy, Ruston

S
St. Aloysius Catholic High School, New Orleans
St. Augustine High School, New Roads
St. Bernard High School, St. Bernard
St. Catherine's High School, New Orleans
St. Charles Borromeo High School, Destrehan
St. Dominic's High School, New Orleans
St. Francis de Sales High School, Houma
St. Francisville High School, St. Francisville
St. Gabriel High School, St. Gabriel
St. Helena High School, Greensburg
St. James High School, Convent
St. John at Lamourie High School, Evangeline
St. John High School, rural Claiborne Parish
St. John's Catholic High School, Shreveport
St. Joseph High School, St. Joseph
St. Joseph's Catholic School, Rayne
St. Landry High School, Opelousas
St. Louis High School, Welcome
St. Lucy High School, Houma
St. Maria Goretti Catholic School, Lake Arthur
St. Martin Academy, St. Martinville
St. Matthew's High School, Melrose
St. Michael Catholic School, Crowley
St. Peter Claver High School, Grand Coteau
St. Tammany High School, Slidell
Sam Barthe School for Boys, Metairie
Sam Crowe High School, Oak Grove
Samuel J. Peters High School, New Orleans
Sarepta High School, Sarepta
Scott High School, Scott
Scottville High School, rural Plaquemines Parish
Second Ward High School, Edgard
Second Ward High School, Gloster
Servier High School, Ferriday
Servier-Rosenwald High School, Ferriday
Seton Academy, New Orleans
Seventh District Academy, Crowley
Shady Grove School, Saline
Shady Grove High School, Rosedale
Shongaloo High School, Shongaloo
Shreve Christian School, Shreveport
Shreveport High School, Shreveport
Sibley High School, Sibley
Simmesport High School, Simmesport
S.J. Peters High School, New Orleans
Sojourner Truth Academy, New Orleans
South Alexandria High School, Alexandria
South Rapides Academy, LeCompte
Southdown High School, Houma
Southfield School, Shreveport
Southside High School, Ringgold
Southwest Rapides High School, Glenmora
Southwood Academy, Hammond
Spearsville High School, Spearsville
Springhill High School, near Natchitoches
Springhill High School, Springhill
Springville High School, Coushatta
Spring Ridge High School, Keithville
Start High School, Start
Sugarland High School, Sugarland
Sumpter Williams High School, Morgan City
Sunrise High School, Empire
Sunset High School, Sunset
Sunshine High School, Sunshine
Swayze High School, Richwood

T
Tallulah High School, Tallulah
Tensas-Rosenwald High School, St. Joseph
Tenth District Academy, Monroe
Terzia High School, Monroe
The Church Academy, Baton Rouge
The Hopewell School, Dubach
Thomastown High School, Thomastown
Thomas A. Levy High School, Rosedale
Thurgood Marshall Early College High School, New Orleans
Tim Tippitt High School, West Monroe
Trinity Heights Christian Academy, Shreveport
Trout High School, Trout
Trout-Goodpine High School, Trout
Tullos High School, Tullos

U
Union Baptist School, Monroe
Union High School, Farmerville
Union High School, rural Morehouse Parish
Union High School, Shreveport
Union Central High School, Columbia
University Academy of Central Louisiana, Alexandria
Upper Pointe Coupee High School, Batchelor
Urania High School, Urania

V
Valencia High School, Shreveport
Valley Forge Academy, Amite
Vernon School, Mount Hermon
Vernon High School, Leesville
Vidrine High School, Vidrine
Violet Consolidated High School, Violet
Vivian High School, Vivian

W
W. H. Reed High School, Napoleonville
Walnut Hill High School, Shreveport
Ward III High School, Winnsboro
C. M. Washington High School, Thibodaux
Washington High School, Lake Charles
Washington High School, Washington
Washington Heights High School, Ruston
Washington Parish High School, Franklinton
Waterproof High School, Waterproof
Waverly High School, Winnsboro
Webster High School, Minden
Wesley Ray High School, Angie
West High School, Jackson
West Livingston High School, Denham Springs
Westhill Academy, Marthaville
West Side High School, Amite
Westside High School, Bernice
Westwego High School, Westwego
Wicker High School, New Orleans
Willow Street High School, Franklin
Winn Academy, Winnfield
Winnsboro High School, Winnsboro
Wisner High School, Wisner
Wisner-Gilbert High School, Wisner
W. O. Boston High School, Lake Charles
Woodson High School, Haynesville
W.W. Stewart High School, Basile

X
Xavier University Preparatory School, New Orleans

Y
Youngsville High School, Youngsville

References

See also 
List of high schools in Louisiana 
List of school districts in Louisiana
List of former high schools in New Orleans

High schools, former